George Sugarman (11 May 1912 – 25 August 1999) was an American artist working in the mediums of drawing, painting, and sculpture.  Often described as controversial and forward-thinking, Sugarman's prolific body of work defies a definitive style. He pioneered the concepts of pedestal-free sculpture and is best known for his large-scale, vividly painted metal sculptures.  His innovative approach to art-making lent his work a fresh, experimental approach and caused him to continually expand his creative focus. During his lifetime, he was dedicated to the well-being of young emerging artists, particularly those who embraced innovation and risk-taking in their work.  In his will, Sugarman provided for the establishment of The George Sugarman Foundation, Inc.

A 1934 graduate of the City College of New York, Sugarman served in the United States Navy from 1941 to 1945, assigned to the Pacific theater. He resumed his education in Paris, studying with Cubist sculptor Ossip Zadkine. He returned to New York City in 1955 at the age of 39 to begin his career as an artist.
In 1965, Sugarman participated in the critically acclaimed Concrete Expressionism show curated by critic Irving Sandler at New York University, which also featured the work of sculptors Ronald Bladen and David Weinrib and painters Al Held and Knox Martin.

Notable collections
Black Prow, 1978, Lincoln National Corporation, Fort Wayne, Indiana
Trio, 1969–71, Governor Nelson A. Rockefeller Empire State Plaza Art Collection, Albany, New York
Cincinnati Story, at Pyramid Hill Sculpture Park and Museum, Hamilton, Ohio.

References

Further reading
Irving Sandler. "Expressionism with Corners: Five Younger Artists Show at New York University". ARTnews 64 (April 1965).
Stephen Westfall. "George Sugarman". Art in America, November 2013. New York: Brant Publications, Inc. pp. 176–177. (review of a 2013 exhibition at the Gary Snyder Gallery, New York. )

External links
The George Sugarman Foundation, Inc. Official Site
The George Sugarman Foundation
Purdue University North Central Welcome
The radicalism of George Sugarman’s vision

20th-century American painters
American male painters
American draughtsmen
1912 births
1999 deaths
Modern sculptors
People from the Bronx
Artists from the Bronx
City College of New York alumni
20th-century American sculptors
20th-century American male artists
American male sculptors
Sculptors from New York (state)